Arshad Iqbal (born 26 December 2000) is a Pakistani cricketer. He made his international debut for the Pakistan cricket team in April 2021.

Early life
He was born in the village of Maniri Payan in the Swabi District of Khyber Pakhtunkhwa into a family with military background, the son of Captain (r) Gul Haidar, and considers Wasim Akram as his cricketing inspiration.

Career
He made his List A debut for Water and Power Development Authority in the 2018–19 Quaid-e-Azam One Day Cup on 16 October 2018. Prior to his List A debut, he was named in Pakistan's squad for the 2018 Under-19 Cricket World Cup.

He made his first-class debut for Water and Power Development Authority in the 2018–19 Quaid-e-Azam Trophy on 19 October 2018. He made his Twenty20 debut for Karachi Whites in the 2018–19 National T20 Cup on 13 December 2018. In January 2021, he was named in Khyber Pakhtunkhwa's squad for the 2020–21 Pakistan Cup.

In March 2021, he was named in Pakistan's Twenty20 International (T20I) squad for their tours to South Africa and Zimbabwe. He made his T20I debut on 23 April 2021, for Pakistan against Zimbabwe. In October 2021, he was named in the Pakistan Shaheens squad for their tour of Sri Lanka.

References

External links
 

2000 births
Living people
Pakistani cricketers
Pakistan Twenty20 International cricketers
People from Swabi District
Khyber Pakhtunkhwa cricketers
Karachi Whites cricketers
Karachi Kings cricketers
Water and Power Development Authority cricketers